Chevallum is a rural locality in the Sunshine Coast Region, Queensland, Australia.

Geography 
Part of the western boundary of the suburb is marked by the Bruce Highway.  Eudlo Creek, a tributary of the Maroochy River courses through the suburb.

History 

The name Chevallum is believed to be a corruption of local Aboriginal words "cha-balan" meaning "flat place".

Chevallum State School opened on 1 November 1921. In 1924 it became a half-time school sharing a teacher with Ilkey State School. Later in 1924, it resumed as a full-time school. The school was on the south-west corner of Chevallum Road and Chevallum School Road. In 1962, the school relocated to its present site. The former school building  on Chevallum School Road is still extant and is operated by the Lions Club as the Chevallum Community Centre.

Education 
Chevallum State School is a government primary (Prep-6) school for boys and girls at 460 Chevallum Road. In 2017, the school had an enrolment of 478 students with  41 teachers (33 full-time equivalent) and 23 non-teaching staff (14 full-time equivalent). In 2018, the school had an enrolment of 468 students with 43 teachers (34 full-time equivalent) and 24 non-teaching staff (15 full-time equivalent). The school includes a special education program.

Chevallum School is participating in a national educational reform called the "New Basics", which promotes "Futures Oriented" education based on active citizenship, life pathways, interaction with the environment, and communication.

The school also operates a kitchen garden, based on permaculture principles.

There are no secondary schools in Chevallum. The nearest government secondary schools are Nambour State College in Nambour to the north and Chancellor State College in Sippy Downs to the east.

Economy 
Chevallum is known for its strawberries and participates in the local Strawbfest. It has a local permaculture group devoted to organic and sustainable farming, which holds regular meetings at Chevallum State School.

References

Further reading

External links

 

Suburbs of the Sunshine Coast Region
Localities in Queensland